Keon Raymond (born November 27, 1982) is the former head coach and director of football operations for the Prince George Kodiaks of the Canadian Junior Football League (CJFL) and is a former professional Canadian football defensive back President of 7on7 Association of Canada and CEO of K25 Sports Inc. He played college football at Middle Tennessee State.

Professional career
Raymond was originally signed by the Tennessee Titans of the National Football League as an undrafted free agent in 2006. He then played for the Nashville Kats and New Orleans VooDoo of the Arena Football League in 2007 and 2008, respectively. Raymond signed with the Calgary Stampeders of the Canadian Football League in 2008 and played for eight years with the club where he won two Grey Cup championships, in 2008 and 2014. He then signed with the Toronto Argonauts in 2016, but only played in eight games before getting released on August 24, 2016. He signed with the Hamilton Tiger-Cats in October later that year and played in the last two regular season games and the team's East Semi-Final loss to the Edmonton Eskimos.

Personal life
Raymond and his wife, Bianca, have four children, Keon Jr., Dashaun, Ramael, and Gabrielle. He is a devout Christian and attended Royal Oak Victory Church in Calgary, Alberta, where he resides.

References

External links
Calgary Stampeders bio

1982 births
Living people
African-American Christians
African-American players of Canadian football
American football cornerbacks
Calgary Stampeders players
Canadian football defensive backs
Hamilton Tiger-Cats players
Middle Tennessee Blue Raiders football players
Nashville Kats players
New Orleans VooDoo players
Players of American football from St. Louis
Players of Canadian football from St. Louis
Tennessee Titans players
21st-century African-American sportspeople
20th-century African-American people